Thomas Coe (3 November 1873 in Manchester – 26 October 1942 in Manchester) was a British water polo player who won a gold medal in the 1900 Summer Olympics.  Coe was a member of the Osborne Swimming Club of Manchester, which fielded the winning team.

See also
 Great Britain men's Olympic water polo team records and statistics
 List of Olympic champions in men's water polo
 List of Olympic medalists in water polo (men)

References

External links
 

1873 births
1942 deaths
Water polo players at the 1900 Summer Olympics
Olympic water polo players of Great Britain
Olympic gold medallists for Great Britain
Olympic medalists in water polo
British male water polo players
Medalists at the 1900 Summer Olympics
Sportspeople from Manchester
20th-century British people